Daddy Has a Tail! is the second studio album by Minneapolis-based noise rock band Cows. It was released on July 10, 1989, via Amphetamine Reptile Records, their first album for the label.

Recording 
The album was recorded and mixed by David B. Livingstone, who at the time was the guitarist for God Bullies, and producer Tim Mac. Originally, the record had been mixed to videotape but the result was of poor quality, forcing Mac and Livingstone to remix the entire album from scratch within the relatively short time span of 4 hours. Regarding the album's current mix, Livingstone has said, "I always felt that they got really screwed. I felt really bad." and that he intends to eventually remix the entire album from the original masters.

Release 
The album was never released on its own on CD. It can be found on the Old Gold 1989–1991 compilation released in 1996, with the exception of the song "Chow". Amphetamine Reptile Europe released the album in its entirety on a two-for-one CD that included "Peacetika", although "I Miss Her Beer" and "Sugar" are combined into one track.

The song "Chow" appears on a split with the Melvins for Sugar Daddy Live.

Track listing

Personnel 
Adapted from the Daddy Has a Tail! liner notes.

Cows
 Thor Eisentrager – guitar
  Tony Oliveri – drums
 Kevin Rutmanis – bass guitar
 Shannon Selberg – vocals

Production and additional personnel
 Cows – production
 David B. Livingstone – production, recording, mixing
 Tim Mac – mixing

Release history

References

External links 
 

1989 albums
Cows (band) albums
Amphetamine Reptile Records albums